Up the Elephant and Round the Castle is a British television sitcom, which aired from 1983 to 1985, and was produced by Thames Television for the ITV network. Starring comedian Jim Davidson, who played the role of Jim London, the show spawned a sequel, Home James!, which was also made by Thames. Home James ran from 1987 to 1990.

Plot
Jim London is a young lovable rogue who becomes a man of property when a relative dies, leaving him a run-down Victorian property at 17 Railway Terrace in the Elephant and Castle area of south London. He gets into various problems with the police and spends most of his time getting drunk and chasing women.

Cast
Jim Davidson as Jim London 
 John Bardon as Ernie London
Sue Nicholls as Wanda Pickles
Nicholas Day as Arnold Moggs
Brian Hall as Brian
Brian Capron as Tosh Carey
Anita Dobson as Lois Tight
 Sara Corper as Vera Spiggot
Rosalind Knight as Jim's mum

Production
The sitcom's theme tune was composed by Keith Emerson. The full length version can be heard on two of his albums, Hammer It Out and Off the Shelf.

Episodes

Series 1 (1983–84)

Series 2 (1985)

Series 3 (1985)
This series saw a change in the title sequences. The "Morning world..." monologues by Jim have been removed, and the opening video is the video of the closing titles for the previous two series; the closing titles for this series is the opening titles in reverse so instead of zooming into Jim, the camera zooms out.

Home releases
Series one was released on DVD in September 2007. The complete series was released on 5 May 2008 and was later re-released by Network on 3 October 2016.

Footnotes

References

External links

Up the Elephant and Round the Castle at British TV Comedy Guide

1980s British sitcoms
1983 British television series debuts
1985 British television series endings
ITV sitcoms
Television shows set in London
English-language television shows
Television shows produced by Thames Television
Television series by Fremantle (company)